A list of films produced in Italy in 2009 (see 2009 in film):

External links
Italian films of 2009 at the Internet Movie Database

2009
Films
Italian